Knight Air Flight 816, being flown by G-OEAA, an Embraer 110 Bandeirante belonging to Knight Air, was an internal (domestic) scheduled flight operating between Leeds Bradford and Aberdeen airports on 24 May 1995, which crashed with the loss of all on board shortly after take-off.

The accident
The aircraft departed Leeds Bradford airport at 16:47 hours UTC departure from runway 14, and was observed immediately to veer off the ATC instructed flight path; one minute and 50 seconds into the flight, the first officer reported problems with the artificial horizons in the plane and asked to return to Leeds Bradford.

Local weather was poor with restricted visibility, low cloud, and a recent thunderstorm – 'turbulent instrument  meteorological conditions', according to the AAIB, dark and stormy conditions according to residents in the vicinity.

The crew, who consisted of Captain John Casson, First Officer Paul Denton, and Flight Attendant Helen Leadbetter experienced significant difficulties maintaining their heading while returning to the airport. The aircraft subsequently entered a left turn, rapidly lost height and crashed at Dunkeswick Moor, north of Harewood, North Yorkshire, six miles north east of the airport. None of the crew or nine passengers survived the crash.

Cause 
An Air Accident Investigation Branch report found that one or both artificial horizons in the aircraft failed, leading to loss of control by the pilots and the plane entering a spiral dive exceeding operating parameters and leading to partial break-up before impact.

References 

Official accident report

Accidents and incidents involving the Embraer EMB 110 Bandeirante
Aviation accidents and incidents in 1995
Aviation accidents and incidents in England
History of North Yorkshire
1995 in England
1995 disasters in the United Kingdom
May 1995 events in the United Kingdom